The Northern Light is a weekly newspaper covering parts of three counties in western Maine. It is published by Country News Club, Inc., which also publishes The Conway Daily Sun of Conway and The Berlin Daily Sun of Berlin, both in New Hampshire.

The weekly newspaper circulates in the towns of Bridgton, Brownfield, Cornish, Denmark, Fryeburg, Harrison, Hiram, Lovell, Parsonsfield and Porter, Maine. Its coverage area includes portions of Cumberland, Oxford and York counties.

References

Newspapers published in Maine